The UC Men's Octet, sometimes termed the Cal Men’s Octet or the UC Berkeley Men’s Octet, is an eight-member male a cappella group at the University of California, Berkeley.  Founded in 1948 as a member of the UC Choral Ensembles, the group's broad repertoire features several genres of music including barbershop, doo-wop, pop and alternative, and a healthy dose of Berkeley fight songs.  The Octet has recorded over a dozen albums and is one of only three multiple-time champions of the International Championship of Collegiate A Cappella (ICCA)—the other two being USC's SoCal VoCals and Berklee's Pitch Slapped—having won the competition in both 1998 and 2000.

While the Octet performs regularly around the San Francisco Bay Area for both alumni and the public, the group has toured all around the world including China, Australia, Europe and extensively throughout the United States.   They also perform for Cal students every Wednesday during the academic year at one o’clock on Berkeley's Sproul Plaza.

The group hosts a series of annual concerts.  In the Fall, there is the West Coast A Cappella Showcase , where several groups from all over the country are invited to perform at Berkeley.  Past guest groups in this concert have included former ICCA Champions Brigham Young University's Noteworthy and Vocal Point as well as groups from Stanford, UCLA, USC, Mt. San Antonio College, and the University of Oregon. The group's other annual concert performances include the UC Men’s Octet Spring Show  and the year-end Unbuttoned Show .

Discography
The UC Men's Octet has recorded over a dozen albums. Among them:
 High Octane (2009)
 Octopella (2003)
 Gold (2000)
 Eight Misbehavin'
 Octogen
 All Sing Blue And Gold
 We Eight Too Much (1994)
 Eight is Enough (1993)
 Takin' the Joke too Far (1991)
 Better Eight Than Never (1989)
 "1948-1988" (1988)
 Around the World in Eight Days
 Eight Times the Fun
 Octa-Brew
 The University of California Men’s Octet.

Honors and awards

 1998. International Championship of Collegiate A Cappella (ICCA) Champions 
 2000. International Championship of Collegiate A Cappella (ICCA) Champions

The Octet in the media
Over the years, the Men's Octet has been cited in several California Bay Area publications such as The Daily Review, the San Jose Mercury News,  and the Contra Costa Times.
The Men's Octet has also made several appearances in other media.  From annual appearances on the San Francisco/San Jose radio station KFOG to appearing on the WCAU News in Philadelphia, the Men's Octet have been heard nationwide.  The Octet has even recorded a public health service announcement with the California Department of Health Services entitled “Wash Your Hands” as part of the Immunization Branch's campaign against the spread of the flu. The group also recorded a nationally aired radio commercial for Coors beer to promote "The Pigskin Can".

See also
California Golden Overtones
University of California Marching Band

References

External links

Collegiate a cappella groups
University of California, Berkeley
Musical groups established in 1948
University musical groups